Melaleuca societatis is a plant in the myrtle family, Myrtaceae and is endemic to the south west of Western Australia. It is a dwarf shrub with small, fleshy leaves and many heads of pink or purple flowers in spring, followed by "soccer-ball" fruit.

Description

The flowers are a shade of deep pink to purple and arranged in heads or short spikes on the ends of branches which continue to grow after flowering and sometimes also in the upper leaf axils. There are five bundles of stamens around the flower, each with 3 to 6 stamens.

Taxonomy and naming
The specific epithet (societatis) is from the Latin word "societas" meaning "association" or "community", referring to the appearance of the fruiting clusters which look like an Association (soccer) football.

Distribution and habitat
This melaleuca occurs in and between the Stirling Range, Jerramungup, Salmon Gums and Israelite Bay districts in the Coolgardie, Esperance Plains and Mallee biogeographic regions where it grows sand, clay or loam in mallee shrubland.

Conservation status
Melaleuca societatis is listed as "Not threatened" by the Government of Western Australia Department of Parks and Wildlife.

References

societatis
Myrtales of Australia
Plants described in 1999
Rosids of Western Australia
Endemic flora of Western Australia
Taxa named by Lyndley Craven